HD 126200 is a blue dwarf star in the northern constellation of Boötes. It has been identified as an Algol-type eclipsing binary, although subsequent observations do not confirm this.

References

External links
 HR 5388
 Image HD 126200

Boötes
126200
Eclipsing binaries
070384
Algol variables
A-type main-sequence stars
5388
Durchmusterung objects